The following is a list of episodes of the Korean reality-variety television comedy series Infinite Challenge.

The show's regular run ended on March 31, 2018, after 563 episodes. It was followed by three special episodes that ended on April 21, 2018.

Season 1
Season One of Infinite Challenge was called the Rash Challenge (무모한 도전). This season usually involved the members attempting to complete extreme challenges, such as racing against a train. There were 27 episodes that aired during Season One.
 Regular members : Yoo Jae-suk, Jeong Hyeong-don & Noh Hong-chul
 Recruited members : Kim Sung-soo (8th Episode) & Lee Kyun (14th Episode)
 Member Fails : Pyo Young-ho (7 Times)
 Temporary Members : Park Myeong-su (4~15)
 Ref : Park Mun-gi (National Association of Sport)

2005

Season 4
This renewed version of the Infinite Challenge (Muhan Dojeon, 무한도전) aired between May 6, 2006 and March 31, 2018. While the other seasons seemed to have some sort of theme, the fourth season had no overarching theme whatsoever, but rather a different theme every week.
 Regular members : Yoo Jae-suk, Park Myeong-su, Jeong Jun-ha, Haha, Yang Se-hyung, Jo Se-ho
 Former members : Jun Jin, Gil, Noh Hong-chul, Jeong Hyeong-don, Hwang Kwang-hee

2006

2007

2008

2009

2010

2011

2012

2013

2014

2015

2016

2017

2018

References

Episodes
Infinite Challenge
Infinite Challenge